Delias isse is a butterfly in the family Pieridae. It was described by Pieter Cramer in 1775. It is found in  the Australasian realm.

The wingspan is about 62–78 mm. Adults may distinguished by the underside of the hindwings, which is blackish-brown in the distal area, with the proximal area yellow. Subspecies echo is quite distinct. The underside of the forewings have a larger white area and only small subapical spots.

Subspecies
D. i. isse (Ambon, Serang, Gisser, Banda Islands)
D. i. echo (Wallace, 1867) (Buru)

References

External links
Delias at Markku Savela's Lepidoptera and Some Other Life Forms

isse
Butterflies described in 1775
Taxa named by Pieter Cramer